WYPZ (900 kHz) is an AM radio station broadcasting an urban gospel format. Licensed to Macon, Georgia, US, the station serves the Macon area.

The station went on the air as WCRY on November 25, 1957. It was owned by William H. Loudermilk and initially had a format aimed at Black listeners. The call sign was changed to WDDO in 1977, when WCRY was forced to stop simulcasting with the FM. It then exchanged frequencies and licenses with country music station WBML (1240 AM) in 1978, resulting in WBML being heard on 900 and WDDO's format and call sign moving to 1240.

After years as a Christian station, WBML was sold to Sun Broadcasting in June 2011 and began programming a classic/mainstream country Format in July 2011.

For a short period of time in 2015, WBML simulcast WRWR/W286CE's R&B format before moving WYPZ 1350's callsign and urban gospel format to 900 AM later that year to make way for classic hits formatted "Fox FM" on 1350 AM. With this change, the now-historic WBML call sign was moved to 1350 AM, where it resides to this day.

References

External links
FCC History Cards for WYPZ

YPZ
Urban adult contemporary radio stations in the United States